Sabrin Saka Meem is a Bangladeshi actress and television news presenter. Meem was the champion at the national contest Notun Kuri in 1995. She is currently a television news presenter on ATN News.

Education and career
Meem completed her education from Viqarunnisa Noon School and College. She started acting for television dramas in 1992. She went on hiatus from media in 2008.

Personal life
Meem was married to Shahriar Ahmed Sajib since December 7, 2012.

References

Living people
Bangladeshi television actresses
Bangladeshi television presenters
Bangladeshi women television presenters
Year of birth missing (living people)

21st-century Bangladeshi actresses